Marcos dos Santos Camargo (born July 4, 1986), known as Marcos Paraná, is a Brazilian professional footballer who plays as an attacking midfielder for Brazilian club Inter de Lages.

References

External links
 
 

1986 births
Living people
Sportspeople from Paraná (state)
Brazilian footballers
Association football midfielders
Santa Cruz Futebol Clube players
Ceará Sporting Club players
Criciúma Esporte Clube players
Esporte Clube Juventude players
Veranópolis Esporte Clube Recreativo e Cultural players
Club Guaraní players
Sociedade Esportiva Recreativa e Cultural Brasil players
Grêmio Esportivo Brasil players
Esporte Clube São Luiz players
Oeste Futebol Clube players
Paysandu Sport Club players
Paraná Clube players
Operário Ferroviário Esporte Clube players
Esporte Clube Internacional de Lages players
Joinville Esporte Clube players
Esporte Clube Avenida players
Brazilian expatriate footballers
Expatriate footballers in Paraguay